The 1949 SEC men's basketball tournament took place March 3–5, 1949 in Louisville, Kentucky at the Jefferson County Armory.

The Kentucky Wildcats won the tournament championship game by beating , 68–52. The Wildcats would go on to win the 8-team 1949 NCAA tournament.

Bracket

 = denotes overtime game

References

SEC men's basketball tournament
1948–49 Southeastern Conference men's basketball season
Basketball in Kentucky
SEC Basket